The Rothschild family owned multiple estates in the home counties, particularly the Buckinghamshire area.

Properties
The country houses that were purchased or built in or around Buckinghamshire included:

 Ascott House, Wing in the Vale of Aylesbury
 Aston Clinton House, Aston Clinton in the Vale of Aylesbury
 Champneys, Wigginton on the edge of the Chiltern Hills
 Eythrope, Buckinghamshire
 Exbury estate, Hampshire Exbury in the New Forest National Park.
 Flint House, Waddesdon, Buckinghamshire
 Gunnersbury Park, Middlesex
 Halton House, Halton
 Mentmore Towers, Mentmore
 Shorncliffe Lodge, Folkestone, Kent
 Tring Park Mansion, Tring, Hertfordshire
 Waddesdon Manor, Waddesdon, Buckinghamshire
 Windmill Hill, Buckinghamshire, Waddesdon

History

Nathan Mayer Rothschild had rented Tring Park in Tring, Hertfordshire in the 1830s. It was purchased with 4,000 acres (16 km2) by Lionel Rothschild in May 1872 as his principal country residence. Waddesdon Manor, near to the market town of Aylesbury, was built in the 1870s, Further afield, the Rothschild family owned the Exbury estate in Hampshire, known for the Rothschild collection of rhododendrons, azaleas and camellias, now run by a charity.

See also
 George Devey

References

History of Buckinghamshire
Houses in Buckinghamshire
Houses in Hertfordshire
Rothschild family residences
Home counties